Regina North was a provincial electoral district for the Legislative Assembly of Saskatchewan, Canada. This district consisted of the northern third of the city of Regina. 

The riding existed for just the 1964 Saskatchewan general election. It was created out of part of the four-seat Regina City riding. It was abolished into the ridings of Regina North West, Regina Centre and Regina North East.

Election result

References

External links 
Website of the Legislative Assembly of Saskatchewan

Former provincial electoral districts of Saskatchewan
Politics of Regina, Saskatchewan